The 2. Handball-Bundesliga is the second tier of professional handball in Germany.

Season 
It is directly linked to the Handball-Bundesliga, the country's highest tier, by a promotion and relegation system. Before the 2011–12 season, the league played in two regional groups (north and south), since then it has been playing in a nationwide single division format.

Relegation and promotion 
The top two placed teams are promoted to the Handball-Bundesliga for the next season. The five last placed teams are relegated to the 3. Liga.

Clubs
Teams for season 2021–22

Total titles won

References

External links 
 Official website of the Handball-Bundesliga
 Statistics of the Handball-Bundesliga

1981 establishments in West Germany
Sports leagues established in 1981
Handball leagues in Germany
Professional sports leagues in Germany